Love and Hisses is a 1937 American musical comedy film directed by Sidney Lanfield and starring Walter Winchell, Ben Bernie and Simone Simon. It is the sequel to the film Wake Up and Live. Twentieth Century Fox's Darryl F. Zanuck wanted to continue the series with further films, but Winchell chose to return to New York to concentrate on his newspaper and radio work.

Plot

Cast
 Walter Winchell as Walter Winchell  
 Ben Bernie as Ben Bernie  
 Simone Simon as Yvett Guerin  
 Bert Lahr as Sugar Boles  
 Joan Davis as Joan Dolan  
 Dick Baldwin as Steve Nelson  
 Ruth Terry as Hawaiian Specialty Singer  
 Douglas Fowley as Webster  
 Chick Chandler as Hoffman  
 Charles Williams as Irving Skolsky  
 Georges Renavent as Count Guerin  
 Charles Judels as Oscar  
 Robert Battier as Gangster  
 Hal K. Dawson as Music store clerk  
 Peters Sisters as Hawaiian Vocal Trio 
 Carol Chilton as Dance Specialty Duo  
 Maceo Thomas as Dance Specialty Duo 
 Brewster Twins as Themselves
 Gary Breckner as Radio Announcer  
 Harry Stubbs as Producer  
 Carol Adams as Dancer  
 Hooper Atchley as Joe Moss  
 Lynn Bari as Nightclub Patron  
 Lynne Berkeley as Minor Role  
 A.S. 'Pop' Byron as Policeman  
 Lon Chaney Jr. as Attendant  
 Donald Haines as Newsboy  
 John Hiestand as Radio Announcer  
 Philippa Hilber as Minor Role  
 Rush Hughes as Announcer  
 George Humbert as Chef  
 Fred Kelsey as Officer  
 Edward McWade as Ticket Seller  
 June Storey as Minor Role 
 Charles Tannen as Hotel Desk Clerk 
 Ben Welden as Bugsy 
 June Wilkins as Minor Role

References

Bibliography
 Lev, Peter. Twentieth Century-Fox: The Zanuck-Skouras Years, 1935–1965. University of Texas Press, 2013.

External links
 

1937 films
1937 musical comedy films
1930s English-language films
American musical comedy films
Films directed by Sidney Lanfield
20th Century Fox films
American black-and-white films
1930s American films